The Gave d'Oloron is a river of south-western France near the border with Spain. It takes its name from the city Oloron-Sainte-Marie, where it is formed from the rivers Gave d'Aspe and Gave d'Ossau. It joins the Gave de Pau in Peyrehorade to form the Gaves réunis, a tributary of the Adour. The Gave d'Oloron is used for fishing. Near Sauveterre-de-Béarn it takes up its largest tributary, the Saison.

The Gave d'Oloron flows through the following départements and towns:

 Pyrénées-Atlantiques: Oloron-Sainte-Marie, Sauveterre-de-Béarn.
 Landes: Peyrehorade.

References

Rivers of France
Rivers of Pyrénées-Atlantiques
Rivers of Landes (department)
 
Rivers of Nouvelle-Aquitaine